Michel Quévit (11 October 1939 – 10 April 2021) was a Belgian writer, political scientist, sociologist, and activist of the Walloon Movement. He was known to closely follow Wallonia and its economy. He was the author of the book Les causes du déclin wallon.

Distinctions

Publications
Les causes du déclin wallon (1978)
La Wallonie, l'indispensable autonomie (1982)
Impact de 1992 : Les Régions de Tradition Industrielle (1991)
Regional Development trajectories and the attainment of the internal market (1991)
Politique d'innovation au niveau local (1992)
Réseaux d'innovation et milieux innovateurs : un pari pour le développement régional (1993)
ransnational corporation and European Regional restructuring (1994)
Flandre - Wallonie Quelle solidarité ? : De la création de l’État belge à l’Europe des Régions (2010)

References

1939 births
2021 deaths
Belgian writers
Belgian activists
Walloon movement activists
People from Rebecq